Wonderful is Adam Ant's fifth solo studio album and the eighth LP overall of his career. It peaked at #24 on the UK Album Chart and #143 on the Billboard 200 chart. The band for this album included Ant's long-time collaborator Marco Pirroni, along with ex-Ruts drummer Dave Ruffy and Morrissey's guitarist Boz Boorer.

This album included more acoustic songs than Ant's previous albums. This album repositioned Adam as a more mature pop-rocker, with crafted songs that featured acoustic guitars as prominently as electrics. The album was a moderate hit in the US and UK, as was the single "Wonderful" which became Ant's third US Top 40 hit single. This was the first Adam Ant album to be released in the US before the UK.

Its working title was Slapdash Eden and 25 tracks had been written for the project, of which eleven appeared on the final product. The Japanese release came with a mini poster. Promotional cards were released, each card related to one of the album's tracks including Ant's real meanings behind the lyrics of the track.

Track listing
All songs written by Adam Ant, Marco Pirroni and Boz Boorer; except as indicated.

"Won't Take That Talk" (3:59)
"Beautiful Dream" (Ant, Pirroni, Kevin Mooney, John Reynolds) - (4:12)
"Wonderful" (Ant, Pirroni, Bonnie Hayes) - (4:22)
"1969 Again" (4:18)
"Yin and Yang" (4:33)
"Image of Yourself" (4:02)
"Alien" (3:39)
"Gotta Be a Sin" (4:13)
"Vampires" (4:35)
"Angel" (4:39)
"Very Long Ride" (Ant, Pirroni, Mooney, Reynolds) - (4:39)

Personnel
Adam Ant - vocals
Boz Boorer, Marco Pirroni - acoustic guitar, guitar
Bruce Witkin - bass, mellotron, backing vocals
Dave Ruffy - drums
John Reynolds - drums (10,11), drum programming on "Beautiful Dream", "Angel" and "Very Long Ride"
Technical
Chris Lawson - engineer
Guy Massey - assistant engineer

References 

Adam Ant albums
1995 albums
EMI Records albums
Albums produced by David Tickle